Pierre du Ryer (c.1606 – 6 November 1658) was a French dramatist.

Life  and works
Du Ryer was born in Paris in about 1606. His early comedies are loosely modelled on those of Alexandre Hardy, but after the production of the Cid (1636) he became an imitator of Pierre Corneille; this was the period when he produced his masterpiece Scévole, probably in 1644 (the date generally given is 1646). Alcione (1638) was so popular that the abbé d'Aubignac knew it by heart, and Queen Christina of Sweden is said to have had it read to her three times in one day.

Du Ryer was a prolific dramatist. Among his other works were Saül (printed 1642), and a comedy, Les Vendanges de Suresnes (1635 or 1636). He died in Paris in 1658.

References

 Lancaster, Henry Carrington (1912)  Pierre Du Ryer, dramatist Carnegie Institution of Washington, Washington, D.C.], 
 Gaines, James F. (1988) Pierre Du Ryer and his tragedies: from envy to liberation Libr. Droz, Geneva, being volume 257 of the Histoire des idées et critique littéraire series

External links
 

1606 births
1658 deaths
Writers from Paris
Members of the Académie Française
17th-century French dramatists and playwrights
17th-century French male writers